Evangelischer Friedhof Cronenberg is a historic church-operated Protestant cemetery in the Cronenberg district of Wuppertal. The cemetery is still used for burials.

History and description
The history of the cemetery dates back to 1783. This burial ground was established by the Cronenberg Evangelical Protestant community. The first church building was erected in 1784 at the spot now occupied by the rectory. The present church building Emmaus Church was built in 1857.

References 
 Evangelischer Friedhof Wuppertal-Cronenberg
 Friedhof Hauptstraße

External links
 

Cemeteries in Germany
Lutheran cemeteries
Protestant Reformed cemeteries
Wuppertal
Lutheran cemeteries in Germany